Bobrov (masculine) or Bobrova (feminine) may refer to:

People
Bobrov (surname) (Bobrova), Russian surname
Bobrov, pseudonym of Mark Natanson, Russian revolutionary

Places
Bobrov Urban Settlement, an administrative division and a municipal formation which the town of Bobrov and three rural localities in Bobrovsky District of Voronezh Oblast, Russia are incorporated as
Bobrov, Russia, several inhabited localities in Russia
Bobrov, Slovakia, a village and municipality in Slovakia
Bobrová, a town in the Czech Republic

See also
Bobrovsky, several rural localities in Russia